Cremnophila sedakovella is a species of snout moth in the genus Cremnophila. It was described by Eduard Friedrich Eversmann in 1851 and is known from Russia, Austria, Switzerland, Italy and Spain.

Subspecies
Cremnophila sedakovella sedakovella
Cremnophila sedakovella auranticiliella Ragonot, 1892 (Siberia)

References

Moths described in 1851
Phycitini
Moths of Europe